The Moore House is a historic house at 20 Armistead Street in Little Rock, Arkansas. It is a -story rambling brick structure, built in 1929 to a design by Thompson, Sanders & Ginocchio. It has stylistic elements of the Tudor Revival then popular, including a tile roof, cross-gable above the main entrance, clustered chimneys with corbelled detailing, and asymmetrical arrangements of mostly casement windows. The house was listed on the National Register of Historic Places in 1982.

See also
National Register of Historic Places listings in Little Rock, Arkansas

References

Houses on the National Register of Historic Places in Arkansas
Tudor Revival architecture in the United States
Houses completed in 1929
Houses in Little Rock, Arkansas
National Register of Historic Places in Little Rock, Arkansas